Affirm is a publicly traded financial technology company headquartered in San Francisco, United States. Founded in 2012, the company operates as a financial lender of installment loans for consumers to use at the point of sale to finance a purchase.

History and founding 
Affirm was founded in 2012 by Max Levchin, Nathan Gettings, Jeffrey Kaditz, and Alex Rampell as part of the initial portfolio of startup studio HVF. Levchin, who co-founded PayPal, became CEO of Affirm in 2014.

In October 2017, the company launched a consumer app that allowed loans for purchases at any retailer.

The company announced a partnership with Walmart in February 2019. Under the partnership, Affirm is available to customers in-store and on the Walmart website.

Affirm has partnered with e-commerce platforms including Shopify, BigCommerce, and Zen-Cart.

On November 18, 2020, Affirm filed with the Securities and Exchange Commission in preparation for an initial public offering (IPO). 
On December 12, 2020, it was reported that Affirm had postponed its IPO.
On January 13, 2021, Affirm became listed on NASDAQ with symbol AFRM, raising about $1.2 billion in its IPO.
By the next day, the price of shares had doubled, making Levchin's stake worth about $2.5 billion.

In May 2021, Affirm acquired Returnly, a financial technology service company, for $300 million.

Affirm is Amazon's exclusive buy now, pay later partner in the United States through January 2023.

In May 2022, Affirm signed a partnership with the financial infrastructure firm Stripe, Inc. to make its adaptive checkout service available to Stripe users in the US.

In February 2023, the company announced that it would layoff 19 percent of its workforce as part of a restructuring plan, and shutting down its crypto unit.

References

External links 

2012 establishments in California
Financial technology companies
Financial services companies based in California
American companies established in 2012
Financial services companies established in 2012
Companies based in San Francisco
Companies listed on the Nasdaq
2021 initial public offerings